The Fort Randall Military Post was established in 1856 to help keep peace on the frontier.  It was located on the south side of the Missouri River in South Dakota, just below the present site of the Fort Randall Dam.

History
The site for the fort was selected in 1856 by General William S. Harney.  The fort served as a strategic site on the river to defend two lines of transportation; it operated for 36 years.  It was named for Colonel Daniel Randall, a career Army officer who also served as Deputy Paymaster General of the Army

Its strategic location along the Missouri River made it a key fort in two lines of western frontier defense.  It was the last link in a chain of forts protecting the overland route along the Platte River.  It was also the first fort in a chain of forts on the upper Missouri River.  The most important mission assigned to the soldiers of Fort Randall was to mount expeditions to try to control the many Indian tribes on the Great Plains, primarily the Teton Sioux (Lakota people).

After serving as an important base in the Indian Wars, Fort Randall closed in 1892.

Fort Randall is located in Gregory County, South Dakota at 43° 01' north latitude, 98° 37' west longitude (43.0244, -98.6242).

Site today
The U.S. Army Corps of Engineers-Fort Randall Dam Project maintains the site which is open to the public. The fort's ruins are open for display with interpretive signage. In 2003, the Corps erected a stabilizing structure to help preserve the remains of the historic chapel.

See also
Fort Randall Dam
Missouri National Recreational River

References

External links
Fort Randall Dam - U.S. Army Corps of Engineers
Fort Randall - Missouri National Recreational River - National Park Service

Further reading
 Greene, Jerome A. Fort Randall on the Missouri, 1856-1892 (Pierre: South Dakota State Historical Society, 2005. x, 264 pp. 

Randall
Buildings and structures in Gregory County, South Dakota
Pre-statehood history of South Dakota
Randall
National Register of Historic Places in Gregory County, South Dakota
Forts along the Missouri River
1856 establishments in Nebraska Territory